Alienosternus cristatus is a species of beetle in the family Cerambycidae.

References

Piezocerini
Beetles described in 1970